The Kenyon Building was the first skyscraper in Louisville, Kentucky, at six stories tall. It was located on Fifth Street, between Main and Market Streets. It was razed in 1974 and would eventually become the site of the Humana Building.

It was designed in the Chicago school style with Richardsonian Romanesque elements, and opened in 1886. The architect was Mason Maury.

References

Demolished buildings and structures in Louisville, Kentucky
1886 establishments in Kentucky
1974 disestablishments in Kentucky
Chicago school architecture in Kentucky
Buildings and structures demolished in 1974